A. Veerappan (21 June 1933  2005) was a comedian and screenwriter, comedy sequence writer and director. While having worked in more than 100 films. He is notable for his comedian roles along with fellow actor Nagesh in the 1960s. 
 
He wrote comedy tracks for Suruli Rajan in most of the films in the 1970s. He debuted as a comedian in the film Tenali Raman (1956). He wrote comedy tracks for Goundamani and Senthil most of films in the 1980s and 1990s. His notable works such films as Vaidehi Kathirunthal, Udaya Geetham, Idaya Kovil, Karakattakaran, Chinna Thambi. The banana comedy in Karakattakkaran brought him to the peak of his fame and fetched him high accolades among movie buffs. The comedy brought Goundamani and Senthil to the peak of their fame.

Early life 
Veerappan was born in Avanam, Thanjavur district, Tamil Nadu. At the young age, he acted plays in Sakthi Drama troupe in Pudukkottai district. The three great actors who motivated him that day were S. V. Subbaiah, Nambiar, S.A. Natarajan. Actor S. A Kannan. then, Sivaji Ganesan has joined in sakthi drama troupe and acted along with Veerappan. They were close friends in drama days. In 1950, when Sivaji Ganesan was playing the hero in the drama "En Thangai", he got a chance to play Parasakthi film. Since he acted in cinema, Veerappan was given the role and for more than 25 weeks, the play took place in many parts of Tamil Nadu.

Film career 
Veerappan had written the comedy sequences for several Goundamani, Senthil starrers including Karakattakaran, Vaidehi Kathirunthal, Idhaya Kovil, Udhaya Geetham etc. and directed only one movie Deiveega raagangal (1980). His comedy sequences in Karakattakaran fetched him high accolades among movie buffs.

Family 
He has a wife, Porkodi, two daughters Shanti and Uma, and one son Anand.

Death 
Veerappan suffered cardiac arrest and died at his residence in Saligramam on 30 August 2005.

Filmography 
This is a partial filmography. You can expand it.

As actor

As Comedy Writer

As director

References

External links 
  

Indian male film actors
Tamil comedians
Male actors in Tamil cinema
20th-century comedians
People from Thanjavur district
1933 births
2005 deaths